Bhausaheb Kamble is an Indian politician from Maharashtra and member of the Shiv Sena. He is a two term Member of the Maharashtra Legislative Assembly from Shrirampur constituency.

Positions held 
 2009: Elected as Member of Maharashtra Legislative Assembly 
 2014: Re-Elected as Member of Maharashtra Legislative Assembly

References

External links
 The Shivsena

Living people
Maharashtra MLAs 2014–2019
Maharashtra MLAs 2009–2014
Marathi politicians
Year of birth missing (living people)
Shiv Sena politicians